Wuhan Qingchuan University is a private college created by a joint venture between several private companies and Wuhan University in 2006. The school is in Jiangxia District, Wuhan, China. The school offers education in electrical engineering, information technology, humanities, and foreign languages. The school was renamed to its current name from "Luojia College" in 2016.

External links
Official Website

References

Wuhan University
Universities and colleges in Wuhan